Dorcadion glabrofasciatum is a species of beetle in the family Cerambycidae. It was described by Karl Daniel in 1900. It is known from Turkey.

References

See also 
Dorcadion

Further reading

 
 
 
 

glabrofasciatum
Beetles described in 1900
Insects of Turkey